Bloom Creek is a stream in the U.S. state of South Dakota.

Bloom Creek has the name of Peter Bloom, an early settler.

See also
List of rivers of South Dakota

References

Rivers of Hanson County, South Dakota
Rivers of South Dakota